Niek Vossebelt (born 8 August 1991) is a Dutch professional footballer who plays as a midfielder for Eerste Divisie club Roda JC. 

Born in Harderwijk, Gelderland, Vossebelt began his professional career with Zwolle, where he experienced his breakthrough as a box-to-box midfielder in 2009. After one season, he joined Willem II where he played until 2014, before having a short stint with Emmen. In 2015, he signed with Den Bosch where he grew into a key player, team captain and a proven goalscorer. Two seasons with Almere City followed after leaving Den Bosch in 2018, before joining Roda JC in 2020.

Career

Zwolle
Vossebelt was born in Harderwijk, Gelderland, Netherlands, and started playing football for local club VV Hierden, before joining VVOG. He was picked up by FC Zwolle in 2006, and developed quickly in their academy, making his professional debut the day before his 18th birthday on 7 August 2009, replacing Erik Bakker during half-time of a 2–0 defeat to AGOVV in the Eerste Divisie. He made his first ever start on 21 August, playing 79 minute before being replaced by Said Bakkati in Zwolle's 2–0 away loss to TOP Oss. On 28 August 2009, Vossebelt scored his first professional goal in a 3–0 away win over recently relegated Volendam.

During his first months as part of Zwolle's first team, he was coached by former Netherlands international Jaap Stam, first as an assistant, later as caretaker manager.

At the end of the 2009–10 season, Vossebelt's contract with Zwolle expired. Despite the club offering him an extension, he refused and instead became a free agent.

Willem II

On 19 May 2010, after Vossebelt had turned down Zwolle's contract extension, he signed a three-year contract with Eredivisie club Willem II. He made his debut for the club on 7 August 2010 in a 3–0 away loss to Heracles Almelo, replacing Marlon Pereira in the 80th minute. Vossebelt was mainly a substitute during his first season in Tilburg, making 19 total appearances of which nine as a starter, as Willem II suffered relegation to the Eerste Divisie as bottom of the table.

The following season with Willem II in the Eerste Divisie, Vossebelt played more regularly, making 28 total appearances in which he scored two goals. The club managed to return to the Eredivisie that same season through play-offs, with Vossebelt starting in the decisive match, a 2–1 win over Den Bosch. In the 2012–13 season, the club suffered relegation once again, but they would yo-yo back into the Eredivisie by winning the Eerste Divisie title in the 2013–14 season.

Ahead of the 2014–15 Eredivisie season, Vossebelt featured less in head coach Jurgen Streppel's plans, and his contract was terminated by mutual consent on 1 September 2014. He made a total of 92 appearances for the club, scoring five goals.

Emmen
A free agent, Vossebelt trialled with Eerste Divisie club FC Emmen from 2 October 2014. He impressed, and 14 October he signed a one-year contract until 2015 with the club. Four days later he made his debut for the club, replacing Boy Deul in the 67th minute of a 6–0 home victory against MVV. On 7 November 2015, he scored his first goal for the club, a consolation goal in the 95th minute of a 3–2 league loss to Roda JC.

Vossebelt eventually became a starter for Emmen during the season, where the club finished fourth in the league table. He made 28 total appearances, scoring four goals. In play-offs for promotion, they were knocked out by Roda JC 3–2 on aggregate.

Den Bosch
On 14 June 2014, with his contract with Emmen expiring, Vossebelt joined Eerste Divisie club FC Den Bosch on a two-year deal. He made his debut for the club in a 2–2 draw against Fortuna Sittard on 7 August 2014. His first goal for Den Bosch came on 8 April 2016, in a 5–0 win over Telstar which remained his only goal that season.

On 24 February 2017, he extended his contract with the club by two years, keeping him at Den Bosch until 2019. He had also been appointed captain at that point.

Vossebelt was a solid starter during his three seasons in Den Bosch, making 100 appearances in which he scored 21 goals. He was especially efficient in front of goal in final season at the club, 2017–18. He scored 15 goals in 38 appearances, including a hat-trick against Jong PSV on 29 September 2017. The feat made him season top goalscorer for the club, despite being a midfielder.

Almere City
Vossebelt signed a three-year contract with Eerste Divisie club Almere City on 12 July 2018. On 20 August 2018, the opening day of the 2018–19 season, he made his debut for Almere against Jong AZ in a 3–2 away win. It took him just 12 minutes to score his first goal, opening the score by heading home a corner-kick from Andreias Calcan. He scored six goals in his first seven appearances for the club, strongly contributing to the club leading the league in the first eight rounds. In February 2019, Vossebelt suffered an ankle injury which sidelined him for several months.

In his second season at the club, Vossebelt was mainly a substitute and made 17 total appearances of which only seven as a starter. He left Almere at the end of the 2019–20 season with 46 total games to his name for the club, alongside 10 goals.

Roda JC
On 30 July 2020, Vossebelt signed a two-year contract with Eerste Divisie club Roda JC, his sixth professional club in 11 years. He immediately scored in his debut for the club, closing the score in the 94th minute of a 4–0 win on the first matchday of the 2020–21 season over Jong Ajax.

Vossebelt signed a two-year contract extension with Roda on 23 June 2022, keeping him at the club until 2024.

Personal life
Vossebelt's younger sibling, Thomas Vossebelt, is a former professional footballer who has played for Zwolle. In his youth, Niek Vossebelt worked as a paperboy, but unsuccesfully, as he could not find addresses well. He also worked as a dishwasher in a restaurant.

Career statistics

Honours
Willem II
 Eerste Divisie: 2013–14

References

External links

 

Living people
1991 births
21st-century Dutch people
People from Harderwijk
Footballers from Gelderland
Dutch footballers
Eredivisie players
Eerste Divisie players
VVOG players
PEC Zwolle players
Willem II (football club) players
FC Emmen players
FC Den Bosch players
Almere City FC players
Roda JC Kerkrade players
Association football midfielders